Pausanias (fl. c. 420 BC) was an ancient Athenian of the deme Kerameis, who was the lover of the poet Agathon.

Although Pausanias is given a significant speaking part in Plato's Symposium, very little is known about him.  Ancient anecdotes tend to address only his relationship with Agathon and give us no information about his personal accomplishments.  Around 407 BC he removed himself from Athens to the court of the Macedonian king Archelaus.

Pausanias appears briefly in two other Socratic dialogues, Plato's Protagoras and Xenophon's Symposium.  He is also mentioned in Book V of Athenaeus' Deipnosophistae, and in Book II of Claudius Aelianus' Varia Historia.

See also
List of speakers in Plato's dialogues

References
Harry Neumann, "On the Sophistry of Plato's Pausanias," Transactions and Proceedings of the American Philological Association, Vol. 95, (1964), pp. 261–267.

5th-century BC Athenians
Courtiers of Archelaus I of Macedon
Ancient LGBT people